Events in the year 1638 in Japan.

Incumbents
Monarch: Meisho

Births
January 1 - Emperor Go-Sai (d. 1685)

 
1630s in Japan
Japan
Years of the 17th century in Japan